Dorning is both a surname and a given name. Notable people with the name include:

Robert Dorning (1913–1989), English actor and musician
Stacy Dorning (born 1958), English actress
Dorning Rasbotham (c.1730 – 1791), English writer, antiquarian, artist and High Sheriff of Lancashire